The Original Bible Project is a project to produce a re-ordered new translation of the Bible into English led by James Tabor. The Project is a non-profit organisation. The translation is expected to eventually be published under the name Transparent English Bible. As the abbreviation TEB is already in use for Today's English Bible, it is abbreviated "TEV" for "Transparent English Version".

The project was advertised as early as 1992 in the back of the Bible Review of the Biblical Archaeology Society, and an article Genesis Translation of the Transparent English Bible appeared in the liberal arts magazine of Augustana College in 2006. and has also been mentioned in book jacket biographies of Dr. Tabor. The Project's aim is to produce a new version, the Transparent English Bible (TEV). The first book, Genesis was published in 2020 and is available via Amazon Publishing and others will follow.

The initial translations of the project have already been cited in some non-scholarly works.

Sample translation
Transparent English Bible (TEB) Genesis Chapter 1:1

At the first of ELOHIM creating the skies and the land—
and the land was desolation and emptiness; and darkness was over the face of the deep, and the spirit of ELOHIM was hovering over the face of the waters
and ELOHIM said, “Let there be light”; and it was light.
And ELOHIM saw the light, that it was good; and ELOHIM separated between the light and between the darkness.
And ELOHIM called to the light “day,” and to the darkness he called “night.” And it was evening and it was morning — day one.

References

External links
 Genesis 2000 Publishing

Bible translations into English